Elections to Trafford Council were held on Thursday, 1 May 1980.  One third of the council was up for election, with each successful candidate to serve a four-year term of office, expiring in 1984. The Conservative Party retained overall control of the council.

After the election, the composition of the council was as follows:

Ward results

References

1980 English local elections
1980
1980s in Greater Manchester